Gori or Gōri is the surname of the following people
Adolfo Gori (born 1939), Italian football player
Alberto Gori (1889–1970), Latin Patriarch of Jerusalem
Alessandro Gori (born 1999), Italian football player
Andrea Chiopris Gori (born 1977), Italian footballer
Antonio Francesco Gori (1691–1757), Florentine antiquarian and professor
Daisuke Gōri (1952–2010), Japanese voice actor
Edoardo Gori (born 1990), Italian rugby union player
Lollipop (actress), known as Federica Gori (1970–2008), Italian adult actress
Gabriele Gori (beach soccer) (born 1987), Italian beach soccer player
Gabriele Gori (born 1999), Italian footballer
Gaspare Gori-Mancini (1653–1727), Italian prelate, Bishop of Malta
Gastón Gori (1915–2004), Argentine essayist and poet
Georges Gori (19th-20th century), French sculptor Art Deco
Gio Batta Gori, American epidemiologist
Giuseppe Gori, Canadian politician
Gorella Gori (1900–1963), Italian stage and film actress
Kathy Gori (born 1951), American voice actor
Lallo Gori (1927–1982), Italian composer and musician
Lamberto Cristiano Gori (1730–1801), Italian painter
Marco Gori (born 1979), Italian association footballer
Mario Cecchi Gori (1920–1993), Italian film producer
Mario Gori (born 1973), Argentine footballer
Mirko Gori (born 1993), Italian footballer
Pietro Gori (1865–1911), Italian lawyer, journalist and anarchist poet
Samantha Gori (born 1968), Italian basketball player
Sergio Gori (1946), Italian former football player
Vittorio Cecchi Gori (born 1942), Italian film producer and politician

See also
Goris (surname)